Ashley Fisher and Tripp Phillips were the defending champions, but Phillips chose not to participate, and only Fisher competed that year.Fisher partnered with Jordan Kerr, but lost in the final to Ernests Gulbis and Dmitry Tursunov,  6–4, 3–6, [11–9].

Seeds

Draw

Draw

External links
Draw

Doubles